Route 236 is a two-lane east/west highway on the south shore of the Saint Lawrence River in the Montérégie region of Quebec, Canada. Its western terminus is in Saint-Stanislas-de-Kostka at the junction of Route 132 and the eastern terminus is at the junction of Route 132 again, in Beauharnois.

Up until the 1980s, Route 236 also used to extend further west, with an additional stretch between Sainte-Barbe and the hamlet of Cazaville, part of Saint-Anicet.

Municipalities along Route 236
 Saint-Stanislas-de-Kostka
 Saint-Louis-de-Gonzague
 Saint-Étienne-de-Beauharnois
 Beauharnois

See also
 List of Quebec provincial highways

References

External links 
 Official Transport Quebec Road Map (Courtesy of the Quebec Ministry of Transportation)
 Route 236 on Google Maps

236